Cal is most commonly a masculine given name (more rarely it can be used as a feminine name, as in the case of Scottish Author Cal Flyn) or a shortened form of a given name (usually Calvin, Callum, Caleb), or rarely a variant of the Irish name Cathal. It may refer to:

Cal
Cal Crutchlow (born 1985), English motorcycle road racer
Cal Flyn, Scottish Author and Journalist
Cal McCombs (born 1945), American football coach
Cal McCrystal (born 1959), Irish director and actor
Cal McGowan (born 1970), American ice hockey player
Cal Murphy (1932–2012), Canadian football coach, general manager and scout
Cal Quantrill (born 1995), Canadian baseball player
Cal Stevenson (born 1996), American baseball player
 Cal Chuchesta, alter-ego of music reviewer Anthony Fantano

Short for Calvin
Cal Abrams (1924–1997), Major League Baseball player
Cal Dooley (born 1954), former member of the U.S. House of Representatives for California
Cal Eldred (born 1967), retired Major League Baseball pitcher
Cal Gardner (1924–2001), National Hockey League player
Cal Howard (1911-1993), American animator
Cal Hubbard (1900–1977), Hall of Fame collegiate and professional football player and Hall of Fame baseball umpire
Cal Jones (1933–1956), collegiate football player
Cal McLish (1925–2010), Major League Baseball pitcher
Cal McVey (1849–1926), early professional baseball player
Cal Ripken Jr. (born 1960), Major League Baseball Hall of Fame retired shortstop and third baseman
Cal Ripken Sr. (1935–1999), Major League Baseball coach and manager
Cal Schenkel (born 1947), artist specialising in album cover design
Cal Smith (1932–2013), American country music singer and guitarist
Cal Stoll (1923–2000), American football player and coach
Cal Thomas (born 1942), conservative pundit
Cal Worthington (1920–2013), American car dealer

Other
Cal Adomitis (born 1998), American football player
Cal McNair (born 1961), National Football League executive
Cal Mitchell (born 1999), American baseball player
Cal O'Reilly (born 1986), National Hockey League player
Cal Raleigh (born 1996), American baseball player
Cal Tjader (1925–1982), American Latin jazz musician

See also

Chal (name)

Masculine given names
Hypocorisms